"A Smile in a Whisper" is a song by British band Fairground Attraction, which was released on 31 October 1988 as the third single from their debut album The First of a Million Kisses. The song peaked in the UK Singles Chart at number 75. It was the first (and second last) single from their debut album to not enter the UK Top 40.

Music video

A music video for the song exists filmed partly on London's Embankment.

Track listings

Original release
"A Smile in a Whisper"
"Winter Rose"

Charts

References

1988 singles
Fairground Attraction songs
Songs written by Mark Nevin
1988 songs
RCA Records singles